VHX was a digital distribution platform targeting independent filmmakers. The platform allows artists to sell content directly from their own website, providing design, social media integration, search engine optimization, and analytics tools. In May 2016, VHX was acquired by Vimeo.

History
VHX was founded in 2011 by Jamie Wilkinson and Casey Pugh as a video sharing community called VHX.tv to discover and watch videos from around the web. After helping Aziz Ansari release his standup special Dangerously Delicious in 2012, VHX shifted its focus to empowering filmmakers to sell their work online.

In June 2013, VHX was named to "The 2013 IndieWire Influencers List".

VHX raised a $5 million round led by Comcast Ventures. Investors, who had previously put $3 million into the company, include Union Square Ventures, Lerer Hippeau Ventures and Reddit Chairman Alexis Ohanian.

Content highlights
VHX provides streaming and DRM-free downloads of premium video content for many different artists and distributors. Some titles that have used VHX for online distribution include:

Notable Films
March 2012: Dangerously Delicious, Aziz Ansari’s 2011 standup show.
June 2012: Indie Game: The Movie, a 2012 documentary film about independent game developers by James Swirsky and Lisanne Pajot.
November 2012: "The Invisible Made Visible", a live episode of This American Life.
November 2012: Miami Connection, a 1987 martial arts film restored by Drafthouse Films.
February 2013: Sound City, a 2013 documentary film by Dave Grohl.
April 2013: Upstream Color, a science fiction film by Shane Carruth.
January 2014: Life Itself, a 2014 documentary film by Steve James. VHX powered the streaming of the film from Sundance to fans who had supported the Indiegogo campaign.
February 2014: Camp Takota, a 2014 feature film starring YouTube stars Grace Helbig, Hannah Hart, and Mamrie Hart.
February 2014: Mistaken for Strangers, a 2014 documentary about the indie rock band The National.
April 2014: Stripped, a 2014 documentary about comic strips artists.
May 2014: Kevin Spacey's "NOW: In the Wings on a World Stage," a 2014 documentary about theater and William Shakespeare's "Richard III."
June 2014: This American Life: Live at BAM, the second live-acted release by Ira Glass and This American Life.
July 2014: Restrung, a 2014 documentary about animator Randy Fullmer leaving Disney to go make guitars.
July 2014: Wish I Was Here, a 2014 feature by Zach Braff funded via Kickstarter used VHX for crowdfunding reward fulfillment worldwide.
August 2014: Cowspiracy: The Sustainability Secret, a 2014 documentary funded via Kickstarter.
November 2014: Harmontown, a 2014 documentary about Dan Harmon and his podcast "Harmontown" after being fired from the TV series he created, Community.
December 2014: Expelled, a 2014 feature produced by Awesomeness TV starring Vine star Cameron Dallas.
March 2016: The Watcher Self, a 2016 British psychological thriller film written, produced and directed by Matt Cruse.
March 2016: Winners Tape All: The Henderson Brothers Story, a mockumentary that pays homage to 1980s regional direct-to-VHS horror filmmakers and the influx of horror VHS collectors, directed by Justin Channell.
April 2016: Amityville: Vanishing Point, the continuation of the Amityville horror mythos featuring Catie Corcoran and Lloyd Kaufman.

Notable series
October 2014: Foo Fighters: Sonic Highways, a TV documentary series created for HBO by Dave Grohl and distributed internationally via VHX during its HBO broadcast window in the United States. 
2014: Black&Sexy TV, a YouTube channel with multiple web series.
2014 MeatEater, a non-fiction TV series with Steven Rinella which broadcasts on the Sportsman Channel and uses VHX to facilitate worldwide online sales.

Notable distributors
Comedy Central 
Drafthouse Films
Devolver Digital
Kino Lorber
Oscilloscope Laboratories
Noize TV
Telly2Go
Toku
Team Locon

Funding
VHX is funded by Union Square Ventures, Lerer Ventures, Chris Sacca, William Morris Endeavor, Alexis Ohanian, and Matt Mullenweg, among others. In August 2013, the company announced a $3.2 million Series A round of financing. The company previously raised $1.25 million in its seed round of funding in June, 2012. Previously it was bootstrap funded by the founders for its first year of operation.

References

External links
Official website

Vimeo
Business services companies established in 2011
Internet properties established in 2011
2016 mergers and acquisitions
Freelance marketplace websites
Online marketplaces of the United States
Employment websites in the United States